Martin Franz Julius Luther (16 December 1895 – 13 May 1945) was a German diplomat.

An early member of the Nazi Party, he served as an advisor to Foreign Minister Joachim von Ribbentrop, first in the Dienststelle Ribbentrop ('Ribbentrop Bureau'), and later in the Auswärtiges Amt ('Foreign Office') as a diplomat when von Ribbentrop replaced Konstantin von Neurath. He participated in the January 1942 Wannsee Conference, at which the genocidal Final Solution to the Jewish Question was planned; it was the 1947 discovery of his copy of the minutes that first made the Allied powers aware that the conference had taken place and what its purpose was.

Furniture business
Luther ran a furniture removal and interior decorating business. He joined the Nazi Party and SA on 1 March 1933. He helped Ribbentrop to obtain a low party membership number, and when Ribbentrop was sent to London as Ambassador in 1936, he hired Luther to move his furniture from Berlin and do the interior decorating of the new German Embassy in London.

Nazi career
Ribbentrop later offered him a position in his own foreign policy organisation, the Ribbentrop Bureau. Luther accepted, and henceforward became one of Ribbentrop's favourite hatchet men. Two years later he took over the "Deutschland" department and moved it to its own building.

Luther was extremely loyal to Heinrich Himmler. In May 1940, he was appointed to the position of Foreign Ministry liaison to the SS. By July 1941 he had advanced to the position of Ministerialdirektor with the rank of Unterstaatssekretär; his effective power exceeded that suggested by his title and rank, since he was the liaison between the party and the ministry. In addition he had become an SA Brigadeführer.

Luther attended the Wannsee Conference on 20 January 1942 as the representative of the Foreign Ministry, and after that his principal task was to persuade or pressure German satellites and allies to hand over their Jewish populations for deportation to the death camps. During this period, he also continued to work as an interior decorator for Ribbentrop's wife, helping her with the design of her various houses as well as her clothes. He resented this, stating that she treated him like one of her household servants. She found him boorish, and Ribbentrop was dissatisfied with his not advancing the Foreign Office's interests in the internecine struggle with Himmler and the SS and tired of his mismanagement of office funds. Ribbentrop had also received complaints that Luther was blackmailing people.

In 1943, with the aid of Franz Rademacher, he tried to supplant von Ribbentrop as Foreign Minister but was thwarted and sent to Sachsenhausen concentration camp in 1944; Hitler had wanted him hanged, but Himmler ensured that he merely had to work in the camp herb garden. After suicide attempts he was freed by Soviet troops in spring 1945, but died shortly after of heart failure.

Wannsee Conference memorandum 
The copy of the Wannsee minutes sent to Luther by Reinhard Heydrich was discovered in the Foreign Ministry archives in 1947 and has played an important role in documenting the conference, although Luther was among those who already knew that policy with regard to the "Jewish question" had changed.

Luther's copy of the minutes is the only record of the conference that survived the war, and its discovery was the first time the Allies became aware of the meeting and a follow up meeting on 6 March 1942. At the conference, he voiced concern about the large-scale "resettlement" required throughout occupied Europe, which seemed to indicate that he did not fully understand what was being planned. In addition, he had a memorandum prepared for his use at the conference, which speaks only of expulsions; it has been used by Holocaust deniers to argue that the conference did not present a policy of genocide, but is consistent with a change in policy.

Portrayals in media
Luther is played by Hans-Werner Bussinger in the German television drama-documentary Die Wannseekonferenz (1984).
Luther played an integral part in Robert Harris' 1992 alternate history novel, Fatherland. In the 1994 HBO film adaptation, Luther was renamed Franz Luther and was played by John Woodvine.
 In the 2001 HBO film Conspiracy, Luther is played by Kevin McNally.
Luther is briefly portrayed in Daniel Silva's 2003 book The Confessor, which is part of Silva's Gabriel Allon series.
In the 2022 German film Die Wannseekonferenz he was played by the Austrian actor Simon Schwarz

References

Further reading

1895 births
1945 deaths
Holocaust perpetrators
Nazi Party officials
Diplomats from Berlin
Planning the Holocaust
Sturmabteilung personnel
German prisoners and detainees
Sachsenhausen concentration camp prisoners